Neellakunta is a village near Palamaner, India. It is located within the Palamaner Mandal.

Villages in Chittoor district